State Road 322 (NM 322) is a  state highway in the US state of New Mexico. NM 322's western terminus is at the end of route west-southwest of Monument, and the eastern terminus is at NM 8 in Monument.

Major intersections

See also

References

322
Transportation in Lea County, New Mexico